Shatunovo is a rural locality (a selo) and the administrative center of Shatunovsky Selsoviet, Zalesovsky District, Altai Krai, Russia. The population was 836 as of 2013. There are 16 streets.

Geography 
Shatunovo is located 23 km southwest of Zalesovo (the district's administrative centre) by road. Kalinovka is the nearest rural locality.

References 

Rural localities in Zalesovsky District